Phir Kab Milogi is a 1974 Bollywood romance film directed by Hrishikesh Mukherjee. The music for the film was composed by R.D. Burman.

Plot 
Sapna (Mala Sinha) is having fun meeting her employee Rajesh (Biswajit) as Paro, and then, in the city as Sapna; and Rajesh falls for the simplicity of Paro. His heart breaks when he realizes both Sapna and Paro are one, and he leaves his job, and goes to a remote village, where he once again meets Sapna, but this time, as a would be of local contractor, Diwan Sahab. She is taken hostage by Teja (Dilip Kumar) because of a confusion that she is his sister. His sister, realizing that Teja would kill Sapna, lets her go, but Sapna doesn't reach back to her cottage. Would Rajesh ever be able to tell her he loved her; more importantly, is Sapna alive?

Cast 
Mala Sinha as Sapna Sheth / Paro
Biswajeet as Rajesh Sharma (as Biswajit)
Deven Verma as Devi Das (as Deven Varma)
Vijaya Choudhury as Neela (as Vijaya Chowdhary)
Abhi Bhattacharya as Colonel
Kumari Naaz as Amba (as Naaz)
David Abraham as Drunk (as David)
Sailesh Kumar as Sailesh
Sujata
Bipin Gupta as Sapna's Father
Neelima as Nilima
Ram Murti Chaturvedi
Uma Dutt as Employer
Praveen Paul as Neela's Mother (as Pravin Paul)
Dilip Kumar as Teja Singh (Guest Appearance)
Bishan Khanna
 Harbans Darshan M.Arora as Inspector

Soundtrack
The soundtrack was composed by R. D. Burman and the credit for the lyrics goes for Majrooh Sultanpuri. The song "Kahin Karti Hogi" was an inspiration taken from "The Lonely Bull" by Herb Alpert.Entire song is different but 'Mukhda' can be called inspired.

References

External links 
 

1974 films
1970s Hindi-language films
1974 romantic drama films
Indian romantic drama films